Air France Flight 406 was a Lockheed L-1649 Starliner that crashed in Algeria on May 10, 1961, after a bomb exploded on board. All 78 passengers and crew on board were killed. It was the worst aviation disaster involving a Lockheed Starliner.

Flight
Air France Flight 406 was an international scheduled passenger flight originating in Brazzaville, Congo, on a route with the final destination Paris, France. Intermediate stops were Fort Lamy, Chad, and Marseille, France. The flight was flown by a Lockheed L-1649 Starliner, F-BHBM De Grasse.

All aboard Flight 406 were killed.

Eighteen children were among the dead. Among them were the three young children of the United States Charge d'Affaires in the Central African Republic, who, along with their mother (the charge's wife), were on Flight 406 headed for London. Also among the dead were a count and countess, plus two Central African Republic government ministers. Rumors began to surface after Flight 406's crash that it had been an assassination by enemies of the Central African Republic.

Investigation
The most probable cause of Air France Flight 406 crashing was sabotage with a nitrocellulose explosive.

See also
 List of accidents and incidents involving commercial aircraft
 Air France Flight 2005, another Air France aviation disaster that took place on the continent of Africa in 1961

References

External links

406
Airliner bombings
Aviation accidents and incidents in 1961
Terrorist incidents in Africa in 1961
Aviation accidents and incidents in Algeria
Accidents and incidents involving the Lockheed Starliner
Mass murder in 1961
1961 in Algeria
1961 in France
Assassinations
Terrorist incidents in Algeria
May 1961 events in Africa
Explosions in 1961
Terrorist incidents in Algeria in the 1960s
1961 disasters in Africa